Milton "Gummo" Marx (October 23, 1892 – April 21, 1977) was an American vaudevillian performer, actor, comedian, and theatrical agent. He was the second youngest of the five Marx Brothers. Born in Manhattan, he worked with his brothers on the vaudeville circuit, leaving the act when he was drafted into the US Army in 1918 during World War I and replaced by his brother Zeppo. He had no taste for the theatre and became a successful businessman.

Early life 
Marx was born in Manhattan, New York City, on October 23, 1892. His parents were Sam Marx (called "Frenchie" throughout his life), and Minnie Schoenberg Marx. Marx's family was Jewish. His mother was from Dornum in East Frisia, and his father was a native of Alsace and worked as a tailor.

Career 

Gummo was the first of his brothers to make his debut on stage, pretending to be a dummy in an act with his uncle Henry Shean (né Heinemann Schoenberg), the brother of Al Shean, in 1899.  Milton was put into a costume with a papier-mâché head and pretended to be a dummy while Henry pretended to work him.  The act may have only been performed once and was not helped by Shean's deafness or Milton's stammer.

Gummo, who in an interview said he never liked being on stage, left the group and joined the military during World War I. He was not sent overseas because the armistice was signed shortly afterward. Gummo's younger brother Zeppo took his place in the group. After his Army career, Gummo went into the raincoat business. He later joined with Zeppo and operated a theatrical agency. After that collaboration ended, Gummo represented his brother Groucho and worked on the television show The Life of Riley, which he helped develop.

Gummo represented other on-screen talent and a number of writers, and was well-respected as a businessman. He rarely required contracts, believing that if the people he represented liked his work, they would stay with him. Around the time he left his brothers' Vaudeville act, Marx applied for a patent for a clothes-packing rack.  On October 28, 1919, Marx was granted patent US1320335A.

Gummo may have received his nickname because he had a tendency to sneak around backstage, creeping up on others like a "gumshoe" private detective. Another explanation cited by biographers and family members is that Milton, the sickliest of the brothers, often wore rubber overshoes, also called "gumshoes", to protect himself in inclement weather. According to Zeppo in a much later BBC TV interview, Gummo may have received his nickname because he was usually chewing gum.

Personal life and death 
Marx married Helen von Tilzer née Theaman (who had a two-year-old daughter, Karlyn "Kay" von Tilzer, from her previous marriage), on May 3, 1929.; they remained married until her death in January 1976. Their son, Robert Stuart, was born in 1930. Gummo's grandson Gregg Marx is an actor.

Gummo died on April 21, 1977, at his home in Palm Springs, California, aged 84, from a cerebral hemorrhage. His death was never reported to Groucho, who by that time had become so ill and weak that it was thought the news would be a further detriment to his health. Groucho died four months later on August 19, at age 86.

Gummo and his wife Helen are interred next to each other in the Freedom Mausoleum at the Forest Lawn Memorial Park in Glendale, California. Gummo's brother Chico is in a crypt across the hall from them.

Notes

References

External links 
 

1890s births
1977 deaths
American male comedians
20th-century American comedians
American military personnel of World War I
American people of German-Jewish descent
Jewish American male actors
Marx Brothers
Male actors from New York City
United States Army soldiers
Vaudeville performers
Burials at Forest Lawn Memorial Park (Glendale)
Deaths from cerebrovascular disease
Jewish American comedians
American male comedy actors